Alex Bannister (born April 23, 1979) is a former American football wide receiver who played six seasons in the National Football League (NFL). He played college football for Eastern Kentucky University and was selected in the fifth round of the 2001 NFL Draft by the Seattle Seahawks. In 2003, he was selected to the Pro Bowl, due to his special teams contributions.

Lex Bannister Fitness
Lex Bannister Fitness is a gym operated by Bannister in Bellingham, WA, with a focus on Sweat Camps. Like many fitness boot camps, Bannister's classes focus on cross-training, plyometrics, and calisthenics, amongst other exercises, often with a focus on bodyweight movements.

References

External links
 ESPN.com: Alex Bannister player card

1979 births
Living people
Players of American football from Cincinnati
American football wide receivers
Eastern Kentucky Colonels football players
Seattle Seahawks players
Baltimore Ravens players
National Conference Pro Bowl players